Heinecke is a German surname. Notable people with the surname include:

Andreas Heinecke, German academic and activist
Birgit Heinecke (born 1957), East German handball player
Herman Heinecke (1869-1906), American politician
Kurt Heinecke, American composer
William Heinecke (born 1949), American-born Thai businessman

See also
 Heinicke a similar surname

German-language surnames